Chokkampatti  is traditionally recognized as one of the 72 palaiyams of Madurai. This Palayam is also referred to in the early records as Vadagarai or Vadhagerri.

Earlier location
This Maravar palaiyam was located in the Sankarankovil taluk, in the former Tirunelveli province of the Nayak kingdom of Madurai.

Internal Civil war
In 1781, after a civil struggle lasting 12 years, Vellaya Thevar finally defeated Periyaswami Chempuli Chinnanja Thevar and became the polegar. His success "in recovering the estate brought about a complete change in the relations between the Company and the palaiyam." Vellaya Thevar was an active supporter of the Company, while the camp of Periyaswami Chinnanja Thevar sought help from the polygars of Sivagiri and Panchalamkurichi to regain his estate. A certain Peddaswami Thevar, a son of Irula Nanji Thevar, enlisted the aid of several polygars and besieged Chokkampatti for five months. Their siege had to be lifted when Colonel Fullarton descended upon them. In retaliation for the help given by Sivagiri and Panchalamkurichi (qq.v.) to his rival, Vellaya Thevar assisted Fullarton in storming their positions in 1784. After the "Period of Assignment" came to an end in 1785, Vellaya Thevar’s position as a friend of the English became untenable. "When the sima came under the administration of the Diwanam, Etubar Khan was appointed to hold charge of affairs at Tirunelveli. Vellaya Thevar got into disfavour with him on account of his refusal to give him bribes and presents as much as he wanted. At this time, Periyaswami Thevar, son of Irula Nanji Thevar, pleased Etubar Khan by paying him a large amount of money and though his help got the estate of Chokkampatti transferred to his name." A nawabi army restored Periyaswami Chinananja Thevar and forced Vellaya Thevar to flee Chokkampatti in 1787. On his death, three years later, the estate passed to his minor son. The exiled Vellaya Thevar, the ninth polygar of the line (and also known as Rama Bhadra II) continued to cultivate the Company’s friendship and in 1796 the Government decided that his restoration "was no less an act of justice than of policy".

Post Polygar war
At the end of the First Polegar War in 1799, the polygar of Chokkampatti surrendered two forts and 100 armed men to Major J. Bannerman. In 1803 he received his sanad as zamindar and was confirmed in an estate that comprised 18 villages. His son, who succeeded him in 1810, rebelled against the Government and his estate was sequestered in 1834; it was restored to his son and heir in 1859. By 1866, the new zamindar had gone bankrupt. In 1868, the zamindari of Chokkampatti was auctioned to pay back taxes. It was divided into 18 parcels whose owners were known as mitadars.

References

Madurai Nayak dynasty
Palayam